Google Pay (formerly Android Pay) is a mobile payment service developed by Google to power in-app, online, and in-person contactless purchases on mobile devices, enabling users to make payments with Android phones, tablets, or watches. Users can authenticate via a PIN, passcode, or biometrics such as 3D face scanning or fingerprint recognition.

, it is currently available in 62 countries. In 2022, a companion app named Google Wallet was released.

Service 

Google Pay uses near-field communication (NFC) to transmit card information facilitating funds transfer to the retailer. It replaces the credit or debit card chip and PIN or magnetic stripe transaction at point-of-sale terminals by allowing the user to upload these in Google Wallet. It is similar to contactless payments already used in many countries, with the addition of two-factor authentication. The service lets Android devices wirelessly communicate with point of sale systems using a near field communication (NFC) antenna and host-based card emulation (HCE).

When the user makes a payment to a merchant, Google Pay does not send the actual payment card number. Instead, it generates a virtual account number representing the user's account information.

Google Pay requires that a screen lock be set on the phone or watch. It has no card limit.

Users can add payment cards to the service by taking a photo of the card, or by entering the card information manually. To pay at points of sale, users hold their authenticated device to the point of sale system. The service has smart-authentication, allowing the system to detect when the device is considered secure (for instance if unlocked in the last five minutes) and challenge if necessary for unlock information.

Technology
Google Pay uses the EMV Payment Tokenisation Specification.

The service keeps customer payment information private from the retailer by replacing the customer's credit or debit card Funding Primary Account Number (FPAN) with a tokenized Device Primary Account Number (DPAN) and creates a "dynamic security code [...] generated for each transaction". The "dynamic security code" is the cryptogram in an EMV-mode transaction, and the Dynamic Card Verification Value (dCVV) in a magnetic-stripe-data emulation-mode transaction. Users can also remotely halt the service on a lost phone via Google's Find My Device service.

To pay at points of sale, users hold their authenticated Android device to the point-of-sale system's NFC reader. Android users authenticate unlocking their phone by using biometrics, a pattern, or a passcode, whereas Wear OS users authenticate by opening the Google Wallet app prior to payment.

Consumer Device Cardholder Verification Method (CDCVM)
In EMV-mode transactions, Google Pay supports the use of the Consumer Device Cardholder Verification Method (CDCVM) using biometrics, pattern, or the phone's or watch's passcode. The use of CDCVM allows the device itself to provide verification for the transaction and may not require the cardholder to sign a receipt or enter their PIN. Additionally, in certain markets which have a "no verification contactless limit" using contactless cards (such as the £100 limit in the United Kingdom and the CA$100 limit in Canada), the use of CDCVM can enable merchants to accept transactions higher than these amounts using Google Pay, provided that their terminal software is updated to support the latest network contactless specifications.

Availability 
For the most part, Google Pay is available in all the same regions that Google Wallet is, with two exceptions.

In India, tap-to-pay through Google Pay is available through the GPay app.

In Japan, the old Google Pay branding is used to refer to the Google Wallet app.

Supported networks 

 Visa / Visa Debit / Visa electron
 Mastercard / Debit Mastercard
 American Express
 Discover
 Diners Club
 JCB
 Maestro
 Elo in Brazil
 PayPal in the US, Germany
 EFTPOS in Australia
 Interac in Canada

See also
 PayPal
 Apple Pay
 Apple Wallet
 Microsoft Pay
 Samsung Pay
 Samsung Wallet
 Square Cash
 WeChat Pay
 Venmo
 UPI

References

External links 

 

Computer-related introductions in 2017
Android (operating system) software
Pay
Pay
Mobile payments
Payment systems
Online payments